Franz Dorfer (20 May 1950 – 8 January 2012) was an Austrian boxer. As an amateur he won a bronze medal at the 1975 European Championships and competed at the 1976 Olympics, where he was eliminated in the first bout, to Iranian boxer Mohamed Azarhazin. After the Olympics he turned professional and fought 36 bouts between 1977 and 1986, winning 23.

Dorfer was born in a family of farmers, and was trained as a cheesemaker in his youth. Later he completed his military service in Sankt Pölten, graduated from a police school in Mödling, and worked in Vösendorf, near Vienna. There he joined the boxing club BC Schwarz Weiß in 1972, and won the Austrian light-middleweight amateur title in 1973–76. He died aged 61 after a long illness and was survived by his wife and two daughters.

References

1950 births
2012 deaths
Olympic boxers of Austria
Boxers at the 1976 Summer Olympics
People from Waidhofen an der Ybbs
Austrian male boxers
Sportspeople from Lower Austria
Light-middleweight boxers
20th-century Austrian people
21st-century Austrian people